Thuruthipilly is a town in Kunnathunad Taluk of Ernakulam district in the Indian state of Kerala. It is near Allapra on Perumbavoor-Kolenchery road. Thurthipilly is famous for its Jacobite Orthodox church.

Organizations
 St. Mary's College of Commerce and Management Studies
 St.Mary's Public School Thuruthipilly

Religious places
 St. Mary's Church Thurthipilly

Location

References 

Cities and towns in Ernakulam district